TCBS may refer to:
Hard Knocks: The Chris Benoit Story
 Thiosulfate-citrate-bile salts-sucrose agar, a selective media agar type used in microbiology for cholerae culture
 The "Tea Club and Barrovian Society" of which J. R. R. Tolkien was a member
 Tuba City Boarding School
 Texas Community Bancshares Inc. A Nasdaq Listed Company